Santa Flavia (known as Solunto until 1880) is a town in the Metropolitan City of Palermo, Sicily, southern Italy.

Overview
Inside the town are the remains of the ancient city of Soluntum.

The main agricultural product of Santa Flavia is the grapefruit. Additionally, the town, due to its location on the coast is known for its different types of fresh fish.  The town caters to tourism, specifically its many seaside resorts.

Twin towns
 Ondarroa, Spain

References

Municipalities of the Metropolitan City of Palermo